Emotions is the second studio album by American singer-songwriter Mariah Carey. It was released on September 17, 1991, by Columbia Records. The album deviated from the formula of Carey's 1990 self-titled debut album, as she had more creative control over the material she produced and recorded. Additionally, Emotions features influences from a range of genres such as gospel, R&B and 1950s, 1960s and 1970s balladry infusion. On the record, Carey worked with a variety of producers and writers, including Walter Afanasieff, the only holdover from her previous effort. Additionally, Carey wrote and produced the album's material with Robert Clivillés and David Cole from C+C Music Factory and Carole King, with whom she wrote one song.

Upon its release, Emotions polarized the music critics, while some praised the album's production, Carey's vocals, while other found the lyricism standard, and a few criticized Carey for overusing the whistle register. In retrospect, the album has been positively reviewed, with some contemporary music critics citing it amongst Carey's best works. Commercially, the album was a moderate success, failing to top the charts globally including the United States, where it debuted at number four on the Billboard 200, surprising many critics following the success of Carey's debut, which spent eleven weeks atop the chart. In other territories, the album reached the top 10 in eight countries, including Australia, Canada, and the United Kingdom. While selling far less than Mariah Carey, Emotions was eventually certified 4× Platinum by the Recording Industry Association of America (RIAA), denoting shipments of four million copies throughout the country, with estimated sales standing at 3,595,000 copies. The album was particularly successful in Japan shipping over one million copies there, and has sold over eight million copies worldwide. 

Three singles were released to promote the album. The title track, the album's lead single, became Carey's fifth chart topper on the Billboard Hot 100, making her the only artist in history to have their first five singles reach the chart's summit. Additionally, it became Carey's third chart topper in Canada, and reached the top-ten in Greece and New Zealand. "Can't Let Go" was released as the second single from Emotions on October 23, 1991. Due to Columbia's removal of the single from stores in an attempt to boost the album's sales, "Can't Let Go" failed to become her sixth chart topper in the US, peaking at number two. European and worldwide success was very limited, reaching the top 20 in only Canada and the UK. Similarly, "Make It Happen" peaked at number five in the US, and achieved relatively weak international charting, prompting Columbia to halt promotion of the album.

Background 
Following the success of Carey's self-titled debut album, critics wondered whether or not she would tour to promote the album in the major worldwide music markets. However, Carey expressed in several interviews that due to the strenuous nature and the sheer difficulty of her songs, she feared a tour with back-to-back shows would not be possible, aside from the long travel times and constant travel. With the extra time, Carey began writing and producing material for Emotions around the same time that her debut's third single, "Someday," was released in December 1990. During this time period in music, it was traditional for an artist to release a studio album every two years in their prime, allowing the singles to fully promote the album through airwaves, as well as television appearances. Additionally, after a tour that would usually follow, as the next album would be released and would gain new fans, they would search the artist's catalog, and purchase the previous album in hopes of learning of their older work. Sony, however, chose to market Carey in a different fashion, leaning towards the traditional form in the 1960s, where acts would release an LP every year. They felt that Carey's reputation of being a "studio worm" and a songwriter from a young age would be captivating enough to deliver a new album more often than most.

As writing for the album came under way, Carey had a falling out with Ben Margulies, the man whom Carey had written seven of the eleven songs on Carey's debut with. Together, the duo had written and produced seven songs for Carey's demo tape which she handed to Tommy Mottola. Their parting of ways was due to a contract Carey had signed prior to her signing with Columbia. Carey had agreed to split not only the songwriting royalties from the songs, but half of her earnings as well, something she never thought twice about while writing songs in his father's basement. However, when the time came to write music for Emotions, Sony officials made it clear he would only be paid the fair amount given to co-writers on an album. Following the discussion, Margulies filed a lawsuit against Sony, claiming that under contract, he would be entitled to work with Carey, as well as reap extra benefits. After an almost one year lawsuit, the judge settled that Margulies was to earn ten percent of Carey's direct earnings from her record sales, not including an income from any other ventures. While settled, their relationship remained ruined, damaged by what Carey considered treachery. In an interview with Fred Bronson, Carey said the following regarding the contract: "I signed blindly. Later, I tried to make it right so we could continue...but he wouldn't accept it." After the settlement, Margulies spoke of his feelings on the matter, claiming he would hope to one day write again with Carey, placing most of the blame on the record label and concluding "Hopefully one day, art will prevail over business."

Recording 
Mariah Carey had originally been recorded in Margulies' father's basement, with old and minimal equipment. After being signed to Columbia, the songs that would be used for the album were re-mastered and re-recorded in professional studios. However, due to Sony's involvement in the project, they did not allow Carey to produce most of the album, hoping the aid of several famed record producers would be able to ensure Carey's already deemed "exquisite" songs would become popular. After the album's success however, Carey was allowed more freedom on Emotions than on her debut. Since she no longer had a working or personal relationship with Margulies, she chose to work with mostly different musicians than those of her previous effort, with the exception of Walter Afanasieff, the only holdover from Mariah Carey. Even though he had only produced "Love Takes Time," the second single from the album, Carey felt a strong working chemistry with him, soon developing a unique form of songwriting alongside him. Aside from Afanasieff, Carey worked with Robert Clivillés and David Cole from the dance-music influenced production duo, C+C Music Factory. Working with the duo was originally Mottola's suggestion, but after meeting the pair, Carey agreed and wrote four songs together with them.

Additionally, aside from the three men, Carey worked with Carole King, a female singer-songwriter who had been predominantly popular in the 1970s. However, unlike with C+C Music Factory, King approached Carey, hoping to work with her after hearing her perform live on The Arsenio Hall Show. During a conversation with Carey, King suggested that she cover "(You Make Me Feel Like) A Natural Woman," a song she had written with Gerry Goffin for Aretha Franklin. After giving it some thought, Carey declined the offer, feeling uncomfortable about recording a song she felt one of her musical influences performed so perfectly. Still determined on working with Carey, King flew to New York for one day, to try to create a ballad of some sort. The two ladies sat together by a piano over the course of the day, and by nightfall, had written and arranged a song titled "If It's Over." After working with Carey, King said in an interview "I love her voice. She's very expressive. She gives a lot of meaning to what she sings." After recording "If It's Over," Carey expressed the musical connection she shared with Afanasieff, as well as the creative format in which she wrote and produced her music when with him, or working with C+C Music Factory. When working with Afanasieff, the duo would sit by a piano, and lead each other vocally and musically, until they would reach the right note and arrangement. During an interview in 1992, Afanasieff described how Carey would stand next to him, and begin singing different notes and tunes she was thinking of, while he would follow her with the piano. In doing so, he would help lead her to the right note and vice versa. Carey described their working relationship as "very unique," and felt it to be very similar to the form in which she had worked with Margulies. While similar, Carey's creative process with Cole and Clivillés proved different; they would bring her several different tapes and tunes, of which she would choose from. Afterwards, they would work on building the already created melody, and have Carey add and build onto it, as well as writing the lyrics and key.

Music and lyrics 

The album's lead single "Emotions" borrowed heavily from 1970s disco, and flaunted Carey's upper range and extensive use of the whistle register. The song's lyrics were described as "joyful" by author Chris Nickson, and told of a strong and deep emotion felt by the protagonist when with their lover. One of the album's more gospel infused songs, "And You Don't Remember," featured organ chord changes and held minimal production to give the vocals a more "raw and sixties feel." It and the former song were part of a trio of tracks from the album that were meant to pay homage to Motown ballads, with the inclusion of soft church choir vocals, and sole musical arrangement by Carey. Its lyrics reflected the song's raw chorus, telling of girl that is promised the world by her boyfriend, and quickly forget about her and moves to the next one. After the heartbreak, the protagonist asks him "Don't You Remember" all those things he had promised her, and the things they had spoken and dreamed about doing together. "Can't Let Go," the album's second single, is a slow ballad, featuring sad and yearning lyrical content. The song's introduction featured minor chord changes, and drew influence from fifties balladry. For the duration of the first half of the song, Carey sings in her lower and huskier registers, eventually leading to the belted crescendo and falsetto and whistle finish. Of the ten tracks on the album, Carey felt her most autobiographical lyrics were featured on "Make It Happen," which told of Carey's poor and difficult teen life prior to being signed by Columbia. It continues telling of the importance of faith and prayer to God. Nickson described its instrumentation as "restrained" and "very Motownish," as well as noting its soft gospel infusion. Critically, the most anticipated song on the album was "If It's Over," Carey's collaboration with King. It was influenced by sixties and seventies gospel. According to Nickson, the song's instrumentation and basis was crucial to Carey's performance throughout the song. Additionally, he described its content and instrumentation:
As a song full of gospel and soulful influences, it allowed Mariah to really tear loose and show what she could do – which in reality was far more than the vocal gymnastics that seemed to comprise her reputation so far. From a deep rumble to a high wail, she covered five octaves wonderfully, as the power of the tune built. The backing vocals – which once again had those churchy harmonies – filled out the spare melody, as did the stately horns, which entered towards the end. The song was truly a vocal showcase for Mariah.
The next song on the album's track list, "You're So Cold," was originally intended to be the lead single from Emotions, eventually being switched for the title track. The song's introduction features a piano and a capella vocal, working into its chorus. Chris Nickson wrote "The song sailed into the chorus, driven by the house-y piano work, the bubbly, snacking rhythm belying the angry lyrics, the upbeat tone of voice." As Nickson hinted at, its lyrics featured an angry message, calling out an unfaithful lover and asking how he could be "So Cold." "So Blessed" was a song Carey wrote with Afanasieff, infusing fifties style pop balladry into it. Carey's voice in the song is very restrained, as she stays within her lower registers throughout the duration of the track. "To Be Around You" was described by Nickson as "far more staccato." Its production and melody was intended to pay tribute to "Got to Be Real" by Cheryl Lynn, as well as featuring spoken voices towards the end of the song. Nickson described "Till the End of Time" as a "gentle, almost lullaby melody." It was a love ballad, preparing the listener for the song's final track, "The Wind." The latter song featured the album's strongest jazz influence, and sampled a piano melody from Russell Freeman during the 1950s. After Afanasieff presented Carey with the melody he had discovered, it inspired her to write the melody and lyrics, which told of a friend that perished in a drunk-driving accident. Musically, the album fulfilled its greatest challenge, according to critics. It had helped master Carey's usage and infusion of several genres which she had not tapped into during the recording of her debut.

Promotion 
As with Mariah Carey the previous year, Carey did not embark on a tour to promote the album, due to the long travel times and strenuous schedules on her voice. However, while not touring the world, Carey promoted Emotions through an array of television and award show appearances, stateside and across Europe. Carey performed "Emotions" live for the first time at the 1991 MTV Video Music Awards, backed by several male and female back up vocalists. Following the award show appearance, she sang "Emotions" on  both The Arsenio Hall Show and Soul Train. In the United Kingdom, Carey performed the song on British music program and talk shows Top of the Pops, Wogan and Des O'Connor Tonight. Additional European stops included Sondagstoppet in Sweden during mid-September 1991. All of the above-mentioned performances included "Can't Let Go" as a secondary performance in the night. "Can't Let Go" was sung on additional programs such as Saturday Night Live, a pre-filmed studio clip on The Today Show. While the album's final single "Make It Happen" was released only months after Emotions release, the song was not performed during the album's original chart run, however, its first live performance of the song was an acoustic version on the television show MTV Unplugged in 1992, which was later released on her EP of the same name (1992). On February 26, 1992, Carey performed "If It's Over" at the 34th annual Grammy Award, with a full orchestra and several back up singers. "If It's Over" was also performed on Saturday Night Live and The Oprah Winfrey Show.

Singles 

Three commercial singles were released from Emotions. The album's lead single of the same name became Carey's fifth chart topper in the United States, making her the only act in history to have their first five singles reach the charts summit in the country. Additionally, "Emotions" topped the charts in Canada, reached the top five in Greece and New Zealand, and peaked within the top-twenty in Australia, the Netherlands and the United Kingdom. The song garnered positive critical response, with Bill Lamb from About.com rating it "among her best." Steve Morse from The Boston Globe called Carey's high registers in the song a "feeling of pure joy," whereas Jan DeKnock from the Chicago Tribune described Carey's voice as "breathtaking." The song's music video features different scenes of Carey singing and enjoying herself throughout a car ride by the countryside, as well as a small celebration with several dancers.

The album's second release, "Can't Let Go," reached the number two position on the US Billboard Hot 100, failing to top the chart due to Columbia's retraction of the single to boost sales of the album. Aside from Canada, where it attained a peak of number three, "Can't Let Go" performed weakly across continental Europe, reaching the top twenty in only the UK. The song's corresponding video was filmed in black and white, and featured Carey's hair in a straightened style for the first time in her career. The video predominantly features close-up scenes of Carey by a small outdoor fountain, as well as blooming white roses. "Make It Happen" was released as the third and final single from Emotions on April 4, 1992. It peaked at number five in the United States, and as "Can't Let Go," charted weakly throughout Europe, coming in at number seven in Canada, number 17 in the UK, and numbers 35 and 47 in Australia and the Netherlands, respectively. The song was praised by critics; Morse called it "a clear slice of spiritual autobiography," and called the last chorus "glorious." Similarly, DeKnock called the song "upbeat and inspirational." The video filmed for "Make It Happen" featured Carey performing in front of an audience in a large cathedral-like church, alongside back-up singers and child dancers. These three singles have been involved in plagiarism controversies and each disputes has been settled out of court.

Reception

Critical reception 
In a contemporary review, Rolling Stone critic Rob Tannenbaum found Emotions dependent on "commercial dance-pop" and Carey's indulgent vocal exercises, making it difficult for listeners to connect with the lyrics. "Carey has a remarkable vocal gift, but to date, unfortunately, her singing has been far more impressive than expressive," Tannenbaum wrote. Dennis Hunt from the Los Angeles Times said Carey's "spectacular and impressive" voice was comparable to that of Whitney Houston, but criticized the songwriting and production for "playing high on the angst scale." In The New York Times, Stephen Holden believed the record showcased Carey's vocal strengths more effectively than her debut, but showed no improvement in writing lyrics, which Holden said "describe the rapturous highs and desperate lows of romance in blunt, strung-together pop clichés, with minimal rhyming." Arion Berger from Entertainment Weekly found the record "colder and more calculated" than Carey's debut, describing Emotions as "the hybrid progeny of a venerable tradition — the tradition of the R&B diva — and crass commercial instincts. It's gospel without soul, love songs without passion, pop without buoyancy." Orlando Sentinel editor Parry Gettelman was also critical of Carey's vocal acrobatics, writing that the singer had become "so enamored of the ultra-high-frequency part of her range that I'm starting to suspect she may be an intergalactic spy trying to re- establish communications with the far-off Planet of Dogs." Steve Morse from The Boston Globe was more enthusiastic in his review, deeming Emotions "a quantum leap in maturity and confidence" from her first album. He called the lyrics "remarkable," the ballads "unspeakably beautiful," and Carey's vocal and songwriting ability "unlimited."

Retrospective reception 
In a retrospective review, Q hailed Emotions as "a technically perfect example of mainstream R&B," boasting Carey's shapely vocals and "the customary elegance of a multi-million dollar production." AllMusic editor Ashley S. Battel called the record a "musical journey" and "strong follow-up" to Carey's first album that successfully replicated its predecessor's formula of "dance/R&B/ballads." Battel named "Emotions" and "Make It Happen" as the album's highlights. The Harvard Crimson writer Sarrah Bushara noted that, "The counterpoint between the funk aesthetics of the bass and synthesizer and the classic R&B ethos of the piano and percussion is certainly attractive and masterful in its own compositional right".

Accolades 
Throughout 1992, Carey, the album and its accompanying singles received recognition by the music industry in the form of several awards. At the 19th annual American Music Awards, Carey took home the award for Favorite Soul/R&B Female Artist. At the 3rd annual Billboard Music Awards, Carey took home two trophies for the album and "Emotions," Top Female Album Artist and Top Female Single. Additionally, Carey was nominated for two Grammy Award at the 34th annual ceremony, for Producer of the Year and Best Female Pop Vocal Performance, losing in both categories. All three of the album's singles were awarded BMI Pop Awards in 1993.

Commercial performance

North America 
Emotions debuted at number four on the US Billboard 200, with first-week sales of 129,000 units, surprising critics following the success of Mariah Carey (1990). In total, the album spent 27 weeks in the top twenty and a total of 54 weeks on the albums chart. Though it was her second consecutive top-ten album in the US, it became Carey's lowest-peaking album there until Glitter (2001). Emotions was certified 4× Platinum by the Recording Industry Association of America (RIAA), denoting shipments of four million copies within the United States. According to Nielsen SoundScan, the album's stateside sales are estimated at 3,595,000. In Canada, Emotions debuted at number fourteen, on the Canadian RPM Albums Chart issue dated October 5, 1991. Four weeks later, on the issue date November 2, 1991, the album reached its peak position of number six, staying there for one week. At the end of the year, Emotions finished number 35 on the Year-End Albums Chart of 1991. To date, the album has been certified 4× Platinum by the Canadian Recording Industry Association (CRIA), denoting shipments of 400,000 units.

Europe 
In the United Kingdom, on the UK Albums Chart issue dated October 26, 1991, Emotions debuted at number ten, becoming Carey's second top-ten album in the country. In its seventeenth week, the album  attained its peak position of number four, placing higher than Carey's debut reach of six. After charting in the United Kingdom for forty weeks, the album was certified Platinum by the British Phonographic Industry (BPI), denoting shipments of 300,000 units. In the Netherlands, the album made its debut on the charts at number 44. The following week, it moved up to number 21. On its third week, the album reached its peak at number nine, becoming Carey's second album to reach the top-ten in the Netherlands. In total, Emotions spent 35 weeks within the Dutch charts, being certified Platinum by the Nederlandse Vereniging van Producenten en Importeurs van beeld- en geluidsdragers (NVPI), denoting shipments of 100,000 units. In France, though the album failed to chart there, Emotions received a gold certification from the Syndicat National de l'Édition Phonographique (SNEP), denoting shipments of 100,000 units. In Sweden, Emotions debuted at number 26 on the Swedish Albums Chart, peaking at number thirteen and spending a total of five weeks fluctuating in the chart. Following its exit from the chart, the album was certified Platinum by the International Federation of the Phonographic Industry (IFPI), denoting shipments of 100,000 units. On October 13, 1991, Emotions debuted at number sixteen on the Swiss Albums Chart, attaining its peak position of fifteen the succeeding week. Following a run of nine weeks in the albums chart, the album was certified gold by the IFPI, denoting shipments of 50,000 units throughout the country. Elsewhere in Europe, the album reached the top-twenty in Finland; the top-forty in Austria and Spain; and the top-fifty in Germany.

Oceania and Japan 
In Australia, the album debuted at number 96 on the ARIA Albums Chart during the week ending October 6, 1991, attaining its peak position of number eight four weeks later. The album spent thirty weeks in the top 100, being certified Platinum by the Australian Recording Industry Association (ARIA). During the week of October 17, 1991, Emotions debuted at its peak position of number six, spending a total of sixteen weeks on the New Zealand Albums Chart. The Recording Industry Association of New Zealand (RIANZ) certified the album Platinum, denoting shipments of 15,000 units within the country.

In Japan, Emotions debuted at number three on the official Oricon chart, eventually becoming Carey's first top-ten album in the country. According to Sony Music, has shipped 1,000,000 copies throughout the country.

Worldwide 
Emotions has sold 8 million copies worldwide, short of the 15 million sold by her debut in 1990.

Track listing 

Sample credits
 "Can't Let Go" contains a sample of "Make It Last Forever" by Keith Sweat and Jacci McGhee (1987)
 "Make It Happen" contains a sample of "I Want to Thank You" by Alicia Myers (1981)
 "The Wind" contains a sample of "The Wind" by Chet Baker and Russell Freeman (1954)

Personnel 
Credits for Emotions adapted from AllMusic.

 Mariah Carey – arranger, mixing, producer, vocal arrangement, vocals, background vocals
 Walter Afanasieff – acoustic guitar, arranger, bass, drums, horn arrangements, grand piano, keyboards, organ, organ (Hammond), percussion, piano, producer, programming, strings, synclavier, synthesizer, synthesizer bass, tambourine, vibraphone, vocal arrangement
 Vernon "Ice" Black – guitar
 Bruce Calder – assistant engineer
 Dana Jon Chappelle – engineer, mixing
 Gary Cirimelli – programming, synclavier
 Robert Clivillés – arranger, drums, keyboard arrangements, mixing, producer
 David Cole – arranger, background vocals, keyboard arrangements, keyboards, mixing, producer
 Lew Del Gatto – baritone saxophone, horn arrangements
 Josephine DiDonato – art direction
 Phillip Dixon – photography
 Cornell Dupree – guitar
 Lawrence Feldman – tenor saxophone
 Alan Friedman – programming
 Earl Gardner – trumpet
 Lolly Grodner – assistant engineer
 Carl James – bass guitar
 Acar S. Key – engineer
 Ren Klyce – programming, synclavier, synthesizer
 Manny Lacarrubba – assistant engineer
 Michael Landau – guitar
 Will Lee – bass
 Trey Lorenz – background vocals
 Bob Ludwig – mastering
 Jon Mathias – engineer
 Patrique McMillian – background vocals
 Bruce Miller – engineer
 Cindy Mizelle – background vocals
 Tommy Mottola – executive producer
 Keith O'Quinn – trombone
 Paul Pesco – guitar
 Bob Rosa – mixing
 Craig Silvey – assistant engineer
 M.T. Silvia – assistant engineer
 Steve Smith – drums
 George Young – tenor saxophone

Charts

Weekly charts

Year-end charts

Certifications and sales

References 

Works cited 

 
 

Mariah Carey albums
1991 albums
Columbia Records albums
Albums produced by Walter Afanasieff
Albums produced by David Cole (record producer)
Albums produced by Carole King
Albums involved in plagiarism controversies